Alice May Douglas (June 28, 1865 – January 6, 1943) was an American author of poetry, children's literature, and non-fiction, as well as a newspaper editor.

Biography
Alice May Douglas was born in Bath, Maine, June 28, 1865, which remained her residence for the remainder of her life. She had no formal training in writing, saying instead that "All my poems and stories are the result of inspiration."

She began her career as an author at the age of eleven years, when her first published article appeared among the children's productions of St. Nicholas Magazine. The reading of Little Women at the age of thirteen marked an epoch in her life. She determined to be an author like Jo, and, like her, send for publication a composition she wrote to test her chances of getting published. Consequently, she sent a poem pertaining to a little sister, who shortly before death was seen throwing kisses to God. The Zion's Herald, to which the poem was sent, published it, and from that time, Douglas was a constant contributor to the press.

Douglas was also engaged in editorial work on two monthly papers, the Pacific Banner and the Acorn. Her first volume of poems was Phlox (Bath, Maine, 1888). This was followed during the same year by a second volume, May Flowers (Bath, Maine, 1888). Then she published Gems Without Polish (New York, 1890). She next wrote two juvenile books, one for boys and the other for girls, in the interest of the Lend-A-Hand Clubs. Most of her books first appeared as serials. Among them were Jewel Gatherers, Quaker John in the Civil War, How the Little Cousins Formed a Museum, The Peace-Makers, and Self-exiled from Russia, a story of the Mennonites.

Douglas was State superintendent of the department of peace and arbitration of the Woman's Christian Temperance Union. She also assisted the national peace department of that organization, by preparing much of its necessary literature and by founding a peace band for children, which had branches in Palestine and Australia.

By religion, she was Methodist. Douglas died January 6, 1943.

Selected works
 Phlox, 1888
 May Flowers, 1888
 Gems Without Polish, 1890
 Jewel Gatherers
 Quaker John in the Civil War
 How the Little Cousins Formed a Museum
 The Peace-Makers
 Self-exiled from Russia

See also

 List of people from Bath, Maine

References

Attribution

Bibliography

External links
 
 

1865 births
1943 deaths
19th-century American women writers
19th-century American poets
American editors
American women poets
Woman's Christian Temperance Union people
People from Bath, Maine
Writers from Maine
Wikipedia articles incorporating text from A Woman of the Century